Shreepech is a crown traditionally worn by Nepalese monarchs.

The Shreepech is currently located at the Narayanhiti Palace Museum since 2018. It consists of 3,000 precious stones, including 723 diamonds, 2,372 pearls, 47 emeralds and 16 rubies.

History 
Although there is no definite evidence as to when the Shreepech was created, Rajendra Bikram Shah was the first King of Nepal who started wearing the Shreepech.

Description 
Apart from the Kalki (a large tail feather of the bird-of-paradise), the Shreepech is studded with diamonds, pearls, rubies, Navaratnas, gold and silver. On June 29, 1965, while keeping the records of Shreepech handed over by the Government of Nepal, officials of the Nepal Gold and Silver Business Association prepared a report that diamond, ruby, Navaratna, and gold were used in Shreepech in large quantities and the largest part was silver.

See also
Coronation of the Nepalese monarch

References 

Crowns (headgear)
Nepalese monarchy
Nepalese culture